The Stadium of Domitian, also known as the Circus Agonalis, was located to the north of the Campus Martius in Rome, Italy. The Stadium was commissioned around AD 80 by Emperor Titus Flavius Domitianus as a gift to the people of Rome and was used almost entirely for athletic contests. In Christian tradition, Agnes of Rome was martyred there.

History

Construction and design 
The Stadium of Domitian was dedicated in AD 86, as part of an Imperial building programme at the Field of Mars, following the damage or destruction of most of its buildings by fire in AD 79. It was Rome's first permanent venue for competitive athletics, erected for Domitian's celebration of the Capitoline Games. It was patterned after Greek stadia and seated approximately 30,000. The substructures and support frames were made of brick and concrete – a robust, fire-retardant and relatively cheap material – clad in marble. Stylistically, the Stadium facades would have resembled those of the Colosseum; the floor plan was a scaled down version of the Circus Maximus, having a similarly semi-circular end. This arrangement offered a clear view of the track from most seats. The typically Greek layout gave the Stadium its Latinised Greek name, in agones (the place or site of the competitions). The flattened end was sealed by two vertically staggered entrance galleries and the perimeter was arcaded beneath the seating levels, with travertine pilasters between its cavea (enclosures). The formation of a continuous arena trackway by a raised "spina" or strip has been conjectured.

The Stadium of Domitian was the northernmost of a series of public buildings on Campus Martius. To its south stood the smaller and more intimate Odeon of Domitian, used for recitals, songs and orations. The southernmost end of the Campus was dominated by the Theater of Pompey, restored by Domitian during the same rebuilding program.

Uses
The Stadium was used almost entirely for athletic contests. For "a few years", following fire damage to the Colosseum in AD 217, it was used for gladiator shows. According to the Historia Augusta's garish account of Emperor Elagabalus, the arcades were used as brothels and the emperor Severus Alexander funded his restoration of the Stadium partly with tax-revenue from the latter. In Christian martyr-legend, St Agnes was put to death there during the reign of the emperor Diocletian, in or near one of its arcades. With the economic and political crises of the later Imperial and post-Imperial eras, the Stadium seems to have fallen out of its former use; the arcades provided living quarters for the poor and the arena a meeting place. It may have been densely populated: "With the decline of the city after the barbarian invasions, the rapidly dwindling population gradually abandoned the surrounding hills and was concentrated in the campus Martius, which contained the main part of Rome until the new developments in the nineteenth century." Substantial portions of the structure survived into the Renaissance era, when they were mined and robbed for building materials.

Legacy 
The Piazza Navona sits over the interior arena of the Stadium. The sweep of buildings that embrace the Piazza incorporates the Stadium's original lower arcades. They include the most recent rebuilding of the Church of Sant'Agnese in Agone, first founded in the ninth century at the traditional place of St. Agnes' martyrdom.

See also

List of ancient monuments in Rome

Notes

External links

86
80s establishments in the Roman Empire
1st-century establishments in Italy
Buildings and structures completed in the 1st century
Ancient Roman circuses in Rome
Domitian
Rome R. VI Parione